Gholamreza Tajgardoon (born September 1966) is an Iranian reformist politician who is currently a member of Parliament from Gachsaran and Basht district and also head of Parliament's Commission on Plan, Budget and Calculations. Previously, he held Deputy Head of Management and Planning Organization of Iran from 2003 until 2005 during Mohammad Khatami's presidency.

References

1966 births
Living people
Shahid Beheshti University alumni
Members of the 10th Islamic Consultative Assembly
Members of the 9th Islamic Consultative Assembly
Iranian economists
People from Dogonbadan
Academic staff of Payame Noor University